Amonap, also known as Apalakiri, is a Cariban language spoken by the Kuikuro and Kalapalo peoples of Brazil, and formerly by the Matipu. It is spoken in seven villages along the Culuene River in the Xingu Indigenous Park of Mato Grosso.

Although bilingualism in Brazilian Portuguese is prevalent among the men of the community, Amonap is not as immediately endangered as are many Brazilian languages. As of 2006, there are an estimated 1,100 native speakers of the language, including 600 Kuikúro and 500 Kalapálo, who speak the same language but are ethnically distinct. The Endangered Languages Project lists the language as "threatened". 

In collaboration with linguist Bruna Franchetto, the Kuikuro have created a library of recordings that feature Kuikuro stories in the language that is archived at the Archive of the Indigenous Languages of Latin America. The remainder of this article will discuss the language as spoken by the Kuikuro.

Phonology 

 /p/ can also be heard as [ɸ] in medial positions. 
 Plosives /p, t, k/ when preceded by nasals are heard as prenasalized and voiced [ᵐb, ⁿd, ᵑɡ].

Morphology 
Like most of the Carib family, Kuikuro is an agglutinative language with a highly complex morphology that effects both verbs and nouns. It is head-final and dependent marking. Its case system is ergative. A sample sentence shows the S/O V structure, the morphological richness, and the ergativity of Kuikuro:

Plurality 
Kuikuro nouns can occur bare, with both number and definiteness being unmarked. Like many other neutral number languages (Korean, for example) there is a morpheme which - when affixed to a noun - denotes it as plural and marked. In Kuikuro this is the morpheme /-ko/. The following is demonstrative of one of the morpheme’s regular usages.

It is important to note here that the morpheme /-ko/ is only used on nouns that are [+animate] as in (2) but not (3).

In addition to the bound morpheme /-ko/, there is a quantifier which also serves to pluralize nouns; /tuguhu/. This quantifier is used to indicate that its entire constituent is pluralized. Unlike /-ko/ it can be used to mark plurality on nouns that are [-animate]. The following data is a minimal pair of readings that show the scope of /tuguhu/ and its usage as a pluralizer of [-animate] nouns.

The preceding two morphemes are pluralizers of non-collective nouns. There is another set of morphemes which collectivize and pluralize nouns into sets that are – generally – based on the Kuikuro understanding of inter-personal relationships and kinship. Below is demonstrative of the collectivization concept, but not necessarily of the phono-morphological reality of its creation.

These collective plurals and the collective plural morphemes are rich and complex and warrant further study.

Pronouns and Pronominals 
Pronouns and pronominal expressions in Kuikuro are bound morphemes that can be prefixed onto nouns, verbs, and certain particles. A partial set is listed below, allomorphs are not included.

These pronouns - when affixed to a VP - have an absolutive reading.

To affect an ergative reading of a pronoun, it is prefixed to the ergative particle /heke/. The data below also shows that /-ko/ - as a pronominal pluralizer – is placed at the end of the verb construction.

Apart from their use as arguments for VPs, pronouns are also used to denote possession on NPs. These possessive prefixes are generally the same as their pronominal counter-parts. The data below also shows how the possessive pronouns are also split if they are in the plural.

Pronouns surface in Kuikuro as pronominal prefixes. They can act as arguments when attached to VPs or certain morphemes like /heke/, and they can act as possessives. They also display a number of phonologically conditioned allomorphs. Unlike its treatment of plurality, Kuikuro’s use of pronouns is largely unremarkable.

Syntax

Case 
Kuikuro from a typological prospective is ergative. There is no obvious absolutive case marker. The morpheme /heke/ is used with some variety of nominal or pronominal argument to denote the ergativity of the argument. Below is an example of a basic sentence.

However, there is also data that suggests that there is an accusative element to the Kuikuro case system. This is shown in clefting situations, where /heke/ is not used and the language must find other strategies for showing case. In these scenarios, the verb takes on additional morphology to show for a non-agentive reading on the initial argument. Below is a pair of sentences that show the changes in their canonical form.

The ‘ng-‘ in the second example above is an object marker which blocks the reading of the sentence from being “it was a turtle that was eating my sister.” This is some evidence towards an accusative reading. But, there is no morphology on the argument itself and so it would be difficult to announce this as an accusative case rather than a different focus of the verb.

Other than the possible issues presented above, Kuikuro is a rather straightforward example of an ergative case system.

Semantics

Constructions with Numerals 
Numerals function quite differently in Kuikuro than the typical Indo-European system. First, there are morphemes for 1-5 and 10 only. The rest of the numerals are phrasal.

The rest of the numbers from 6-9 and 11-20 are expressed through phrase-level constructions such as the following.

In NP-modifying constructions, numerals can occur either before the NP to be modified or at the end of the sentence.

Neither of the above examples can be read as having been counting the VP. To achieve this, the numeral must occur immediately preceding the VP it is quantifying.

Critically, the above cannot be read as ‘three months’ but has to be a verb-numeral construction.

The counting of mass nouns hinges on the fact that Kuikuro is a number neutral language. In this system nouns can occur as either plural or singular and can occur bare. The Kuikuro grammar allows mass nouns to be counted using an assumed container. The following is a typical form.

Note that the morpheme /ingü/ is non-obligatory and that the container is assumed. This structure follows for all kinds of mass nouns.

References

External links
Amonap at endangeredlanguages.com
Archive of Kalapalo Recordings by Ellen Basso, an archive of audio recordings of narratives, instrumental music, and text transcriptions from AILLA. 
Kuikuro Collection by Bruna Franchetto from AILLA - archive of audio recordings in Kuikuro with text transcriptions.

Cariban languages
Languages of Xingu Indigenous Park